This is Teen-C Power! is the first release for Bis on the Beastie Boys' Grand Royal label as a preview for American audiences, collecting material from the Disco Nation 45 (1995), The Secret Vampire Soundtrack (1996) and Bis vs. the D.I.Y. Corps (1996) Extended Plays.

The EP also includes a newly recorded version of the song "Kill Yr Boyfriend"; the original version appeared on Bis' first release Transmissions on the Teen-C Tip!. Released as a 10-inch vinyl and a compact disc.

Track listing
All tracks written by Bis.

 "Kill Yr Boyfriend" (2:07) (New Version)
 "School Disco" (2:38)
 "Kandy Pop" (2:47)
 "This is Fake D.I.Y." (2:14)
 "Burn the Suit" (2:46)
 "Teen-C Power!" (3:11)

Credits
"School Disco", "This is Fake D.I.Y." and "Burn the Suit"
Recorded at: the Practice Pad, Glasgow, Scotland in April 1995.
Recorded by: Simon Strange

"Kandy Pop" and "Teen-C Power!"
Recorded by: Richie Dempsty and Paul Savage
Recorded at: MCM Studios, Hamilton Scotland in December 1995.

"Kill Yr Boyfriend" (New Version)
Re-Recorded at the Practice Pad, Glasgow, Scotland in March 1996.

References

Bis (Scottish band) EPs
1996 EPs
Grand Royal EPs